Hiatella arctica, known as the wrinkled rock-borer, the arctic hiatella or the arctic saxicave, is a species of saltwater clam, a marine bivalve mollusc in the family Hiatellidae. The white shell of this mollusc is thick and more or less rectangular, but generally irregular in shape. It is up to 45 mm long.

Hiatella arctica is widespread and found in all the oceans, ranging from the Arctic and Antarctic to the subtropical and tropical zones. It occurs from the low water mark to depths of down to 800 m. It lives on hard substrates, often attached with byssus, for instance in mussel beds or nestling among kelp holdfasts, or hiding in rock crevices and also boring itself into soft rocks.

References

 Hiatella arctica   Marlin
 Hiatella arctica - Arctic hiatella  sealifebase.org (Nov. 2015)
 Mollusca of the North Sea: Hiatella arctica Marine Species Identification Portal  (Nov. 2015)

Bivalves of Australia
Bivalves of New Zealand
Hiatellidae
Molluscs described in 1767
Taxa named by Carl Linnaeus